Maria Azzopardi (born 24 April 1983) is a Maltese former footballer who played as a defender. She has been a member of the Malta women's national team.

See also
List of Malta women's international footballers

References

1983 births
Living people
Women's association football defenders
Maltese women's footballers
Malta women's international footballers
Hibernians F.C. players